Rannia Zoria, originally Berezova-Yarsk then from 1928 until 2016 called Chervona Zirka, is a village in Starobilsk Raion (district) in Luhansk Oblast of eastern Ukraine.

It is the most eastern Ukrainian municipality. The distance to the most western village Solomonovo in the Zakarpattia Oblast is 1,500 km (930 mi).

Demographics
Native language as of the Ukrainian Census of 2001:
 Ukrainian 66.98%
 Russian 19.81%
 Other 13.21%

References

Villages in Staroblisk Raion